Huey's is a chain of restaurants and bars located in Memphis, Tennessee. Founded in 1970 by Alan Gary, it has been voted "Best Burger" by Memphis Magazine every year since 1984. Huey's has also been voted "Best Pub Grub" and "Best Beer Selection" in Memphis Magazine's Readers Restaurant Poll. Famous for its "Huey Burger," the chain operates 7 locations spread across the city. After being founded by Alan Gary in 1970 as an attempt to "create a bar that was fun and unique," Huey's was purchased by Thomas Boggs in 1976. The company now operates under the corporate body Uncle Donald's Restaurant LLC, which is still run by the Boggs family.

History 
Huey's was founded by Alan Gary on April 26, 1970, based on the nickname Gary had when he was younger. In 1976, Thomas Boggs took over as CEO of the restaurant. Boggs' wife, Wight Boggs, served as a co-owner of the restaurant and continues to do so. Other co-owners include his children. They include:

 Ashley Boggs Robilio, Vice President of Operations
 Lauren Boggs McHugh, President and CEO
 Fulton Boggs
 Alex Boggs
 Samantha Boggs Dean
Boggs was partner in several other successful Memphis restaurants including Folk's Folly, Tsunami, Molly's La Casita, and Half Shell.

Boggs died on May 5, 2008, at 63 years of age in his sleep. Huey's celebrated its 45th birthday on April 26, 2015, with a birthday party spanning from 2 pm to midnight. A portion of the proceeds from the event went to Restore Corps, an anti-human trafficking organization.

A character called the "prospector" was created for an advertisement in the late '70s and early '80s by the University of Memphis' then Tiger Rag, which is now known as The Daily Helmsman.

Customers, starting during Gary's tenure as manager, would shoot toothpicks out of their straws and into the ceilings. Boggs initially cleaned the toothpicks from the ceiling, but a customer suggested that he do a contest instead. Customers pay one dollar to guess how many toothpicks, and the proceeds go to benefit the Memphis Zoo. The contest has raised $70,000.

Menu 
Huey's features different menu items, including burgers, fries, onion rings, tater tots, and others. Huey's menu originally had hamburgers and cheeseburgers as the only options. One of its current burgers is called the "World Famous Huey Burger." In October 2018, Huey's introduced a vegan burger option called the "Beyond Burger" in three locations, with a rollout to all locations in early November.

Locations 

On May 8, 2017, Huey's opened a new location at the Shops of Millington Farms in Millington, Tennessee. As of May 2017, there are nine locations.

There are things that can be found at all Huey's locations, including a crutch adhered to the ceiling. Graffiti can also be found at various locations on the walls inside the buildings and is redone every year.

Locations 
  Millington- 8570 US-51, Millington, TN 38053
  Collierville- 2130 W Poplar Ave, Collierville, TN 38017,
  Cordova- 1771 N Germantown Pkwy, Cordova, TN 38016
  Downtown Memphis- 77 S 2nd St, Memphis, TN 38103
  Germantown- 7677 Farmington Blvd, Germantown, TN 38138
  Midtown Memphis- 1927 Madison Ave, Memphis, TN 38104
  East Memphis- 4872 Poplar Ave, Memphis, TN 38117
  Southaven- 7090 Malco Blvd, Southaven, MS 38671
  Southwind- 7825 Winchester Rd, Memphis, TN 38125
  Olive Branch-  8179 McGregor Crossing Suite 200, Olive Branch, MS 38654

Reception 
Since 1984, its burger had won "Best Burger" from Memphis Magazine every year. Kevin Alexander of Thrillist included Huey's and the "World Famous Huey Burger with Cheese" on his list of the best burgers in Memphis. He praised the balance of tastes in the burger while noting minor issues such as the bun being slightly dry. WMC Action News 5's Joe Birch meanwhile called the "World Famous Huey Burger" a great Memphis burger. Commercial Appeal editor Nicole R. Harris included Huey in her list of restaurants to visit in the Downtown Memphis area. Memphis Flyer staff featured Huey's burgers in a list of the most iconic Memphis burgers.

Readers of the Memphis Flyer voted for Huey's, among others, in their "Best of Memphis 2016" poll. Thrillist editor Meredith Heil called Memphis the "best food city" of Tennessee, citing Huey's as part of why.

References

External links
Huey's Website

Restaurants in Tennessee
Restaurants established in 1970
1970 establishments in Tennessee